The Minister for Employment was a minister in the New South Wales Government that was responsible for developing and managing job creation programs, to advise the government on the employment impacts of its polices and to analyse the labour market with particular interest in the effects of structural change and constraints in employment growth. Employment had not previously been represented in a portfolio. It was entirely different from the Industrial Relations portfolio which existed beside it in the Wran and Unsworth ministries and was concerned with workplace conditions, particularly safety.

Employment continued at a portfolio as part of composite portfolios until the Third Fahey ministry in 1995 when it was merged into the Industrial relations portfolio.

List of ministers
The following individuals have served as Minister where Employment was one of the responsibilities in the portfolio:

See also 

List of New South Wales government agencies

References

Employment